Kathleen Effie Widdoes (born March 21, 1939) is an American actress. She is best known for her role as Emma Snyder in the television soap opera As the World Turns, which earned her four Daytime Emmy Award nominations.

Widdoes was also nominated for a Tony Award and a Drama Desk Award, as well as winning two Obie Awards and a Lucille Lortel Award.

Early years
Widdoes was born in Wilmington, Delaware, the daughter of Bernice (née Delapo) and Eugene Widdoes. She is the oldest of six siblings who were raised by their mother. Widdoes moved to Manhattan to pursue stage work and studied at the Sorbonne in Paris under a Fulbright scholarship. She subsequently taught acting at Yale, where she appeared in productions of the Yale Repertory Theater.

Career

Television
Although returning frequently to New York theatre, Widdoes is probably most known for her work in soap operas. She was an original cast member of Young Doctor Malone, playing Jill Malone (1958–59). She played lower middle class matriarch Rose Perrini on Another World (1978–80) and appeared for a short time on Ryan's Hope (1983) as the vindictive villainess Una McCurtain who went crazy as a result of her family's failure to get revenge on Maeve Ryan as part of an old family feud.

In 1985, she began her best-known role, on As the World Turns as Emma Snyder, the matriarch of a new core family based on the real family of then-head writer Douglas Marland. She was prominently featured during the show's 50th anniversary program in April 2006 and continued to make regular appearances until the series finale year although she was noticeably absent during the last few months.

In Season 1, Episode 2, "A Crying Need", on the television series Here Come the Brides, she appears as Dr. Allyn Wright, Seattle's first doctor who also happens to be female. The series ran from 1968 to 1970.

She was menaced in the Dissolve to Black (1961) episode of Roald Dahl's Way Out (1961) and appeared in The Invaders TV series as Ellen Woods (1967), supposedly deranged after seeing extraterrestrials in a barn near her town in the episode "Nightmare". She had a featured role in the HBO series Oz (1997, 2000).

Films
Her film credits include The Group (1966), Petulia (1968), The Sea Gull (1968), The Mephisto Waltz (1971), Savages (1972),  I'm Dancing as Fast as I Can (1982) and Courage Under Fire (1996).

Theater
Widdoes toured in A View from the Bridge with Luther Adler in 1958, and in 1960, she toured with Katherine Cornell in The Firstborn.

She received a 1973 Tony Award nomination (Best Actress in a Play) for her performance as Beatrice in Much Ado About Nothing, set at the end of the Spanish–American War (1898), for the New York Shakespeare Festival. The production transferred from the open-air Delacorte Theater in Central Park to Broadway and was preserved for television. She played other roles for the Festival, including Titania in A Midsummer Night's Dream. In 2002, she received the Lucille Lortel Award (Featured Actress) for her work in the play Franny's Way Off-Broadway.

Personal life 
From 1964 to 1972 Widdoes was married to well-known actor Richard Jordan, with whom she had her daughter Nina. She is currently married with one child and one grandchild.

Filmography

Film

Television

References

External links

1939 births
American film actresses
American soap opera actresses
American television actresses
Living people
Actresses from Wilmington, Delaware
University of Paris alumni
21st-century American women